Board of Trustees of State University of New York v. Fox, 492 U.S. 469 (1989), is a United States Supreme Court case in which the Court instructed a lower court to reevaluate the compatibility of a resolution of the State University of New York that prohibited private commercial enterprises from operating in SUNY facilities with the First Amendment. The Court instructed the lower court to use the standard outlined in Central Hudson Gas & Electric Corp. v. Public Service Commission (1980) and determine whether the restriction on speech advanced the state's interest and, if so, whether the state's method was the least restrictive means to that end.

References

External links
 

1989 in United States case law
United States Supreme Court cases
Overbreadth case law
State University of New York
United States Supreme Court cases of the Rehnquist Court